Cherryvale is a city in Montgomery County, Kansas, United States.  As of the 2020 census, the population of the city was 2,192.

History

Cherryvale was founded on the land of the Osage Indians who were pushed out by veterans of the American Civil War looking for land. The first white man to purchase property and settle here was Mr. Abe Eaton, who later sold it to the Kansas City, Lawrence & Southern Kansas Railroad which then became the Leavenworth, Lawrence & Galveston Railway, and eventually came under the control of the Atchison, Topeka and Santa Fe Railway, which operated the line for much of the 20th century. The town site was platted by the railroad in 1871. It was named Cherryvale from its position in the valley of Cherry Creek.

Between 1871 and 1873, at least eleven people vanished in the vicinity of an inn and general store operated by the Bender family about eight miles northeast of Cherryvale.  Following the disappearance of the Benders in 1873, it was discovered that they had apparently murdered a number of travellers.  Between eight and eleven bodies were discovered buried on the premises.  Governor Thomas A. Osborn offered a reward of $2,000 for the apprehension of the Benders, but they were never found.

The main part of the town was destroyed by fire in 1873, but was soon rebuilt, and in 1880 Cherryvale became a city of the third and afterwards of the second class. Natural gas, which is used as a factory fuel and for street and domestic lighting, was found here in 1889, and oil several years later.

The city is currently the headquarters for the South Kansas and Oklahoma Railroad, a shortline that runs 511 miles of track in Kansas and Oklahoma. The railroad, owned by WATCO, painted locomotive EMD SD40-2 number 4158, in the high school's colors of blue and white in 2011, and the unit is stationed at the intermodal switchyard, completed 2013, north of Cherryvale.

Geography
Cherryvale is located at  (37.268010, -95.550778). Is self-described as the "Gateway to Big Hill Lake."

Climate
According to the Köppen Climate Classification system, Cherryvale has a humid subtropical climate, abbreviated "Cfa" on climate maps.

Demographics

2010 census
As of the census of 2010, there were 2,367 people, 930 households, and 615 families residing in the city. The racial makeup of the city was 94.3% White, 1.0% African American, 1.3% Native American, 0.3% Asian, 0.2% Pacific Islander, 0.8% from other races, and 2.1% from two or more races. Hispanic or Latino of any race were 4.0% of the population.

There were 930 households, of which 34.0% had children under the age of 18 living with them, 46.1% were married couples living together, 12.6% had a female householder with no husband present, 7.4% had a male householder with no wife present, and 33.9% were non-families. 29.7% of all households were made up of individuals, and 14.1% had someone living alone who was 65 years of age or older. The average household size was 2.50 and the average family size was 3.05.

The median age in the city was 36.9 years. 27.1% of residents were under the age of 18; 8.6% were between the ages of 18 and 24; 23.8% were from 25 to 44; 24.6% were from 45 to 64; and 16% were 65 years of age or older. The gender makeup of the city was 49.6% male and 50.4% female.

2000 census
As of the census of 2000, there were 2,386 people, 982 households, and 639 families residing in the city. The racial makeup of the city was 94.09% White, 0.08% African American, 1.97% Native American, 0.13% Asian, 1.30% from other races, and 2.43% from two or more races. Hispanic or Latino of any race were 2.77% of the population.

There were 982 households, out of which 31.3% had children under the age of 18 living with them, 49.7% were married couples living together, 11.1% had a female householder with no husband present, and 34.9% were non-families. 31.2% of all households were made up of individuals, and 15.8% had someone living alone who was 65 years of age or older. The average household size was 2.39 and the average family size was 2.98.

In the city, the population was spread out, with 26.8% under the age of 18, 8.2% from 18 to 24, 26.9% from 25 to 44, 21.2% from 45 to 64, and 16.9% who were 65 years of age or older. The median age was 37 years. For every 100 females, there were 91.2 males. For every 100 females age 18 and over, there were 87.2 males.

The median income for a household in the city was $27,917, and the median income for a family was $33,599. Males had a median income of $25,964 versus $19,356 for females. The per capita income for the city was $13,655. About 13.0% of families and 18.9% of the population were below the poverty line, including 26.4% of those under age 18 and 15.7% of those age 65 or over.

Education
The community is served by Cherryvale USD 447 public school district, and home to Lincoln Central Elementary School (Cherryvale) (K–6), Thayer Elementary (K–8) and Cherryvale Middle/High School (7–12). They compete in the Tri-Valley League and the mascot is the Charger, represented by a knight. It was previously the Fighting Cherries.  The mascot was changed in 1969 by the high school student council after an overwhelming vote of the student body.

Notable people
 Sam Avey, wrestling promoter
 Frank Bellamy (1876–1915), contested author of the Pledge of Allegiance
 Louise Brooks, dancer, silent film star, and author
 Claude Wendell Horton, Sr., geophysicist, acoustic researcher
 Billy Sandow, manager for World Champion Ed "Strangler" Lewis
 Vivian Vance, actress played Ethel Mertz on I Love Lucy

See also
 National Register of Historic Places listings in Montgomery County, Kansas
 Big Hill Lake
 Bloody Benders

References

Further reading

External links

City
 City of Cherryvale
 Cherryvale - Directory of Public Officials
Schools
 USD 447, local school district
Historical
 Cherryvale History
 Historic Images of Cherryvale, Special Photo Collections at Wichita State University Library
Maps
 Cherryvale city map, KDOT

Cities in Kansas
Cities in Montgomery County, Kansas
Populated places established in 1871
1871 establishments in Kansas